The Great Commandment (or Greatest Commandment) is a name used in the New Testament to describe the first of two commandments cited by Jesus in , , and in answer to him in :

Most Christian denominations consider these two commandments as, together, forming the core of the Christian religion.

New Testament accounts

Gospel of Matthew

Gospel of Mark
In the Gospel of Mark, the Shema is included:

Gospel of Luke

Old Testament references

Leviticus 19:18

Deuteronomy

Love the Lord thy God

Matthew Henry sums up the question of which is the great commandment:

Adam Clarke, in his Commentary on the Bible, wrote:

"Thou shalt love the Lord thy God" is explained to mean "Act in such a manner that God will be beloved by all His creatures." Consequently, Israel, being, as the priest-people, enjoined like the Aaronite priest to sanctify the name of God and avoid whatever tends to desecrate it (Lev. xxii. 32), is not only obliged to give his life as witness or martyr for the maintenance of the true faith (see Isa. xliii. 12, μάρτυρες; and Pesik. 102b; Sifra, Emor, ix.), but so to conduct himself in every way as to prevent the name of God from being dishonored by non-Israelites.

Twice every day the Jew recites the Shema Yisrael, which contains the words: "Thou shalt love the Lord thy God with all thine heart, with all thy soul, and with all thy might" (Deut. vi. 5). This verse is understood to enjoin him to willingly surrender life and fortune whenever the cause of God demands it, while it at the same time urges him to make God beloved by all his creatures through deeds of kindness, as Abraham did (Sifre, Deut. 32).

Although only asked about the first commandment, Jesus included the second commandment in his answer. This double reference has given rise to differing views with regard to the relationship that exists between the two commandments, although typically "love thy God" is referred to as "the first and greatest commandment", with "love thy neighbor" being referred to as "the second great commandment". It may simply reflect the "seven rules (Middot) of Hillel", in this case the first one, called Ḳal wa-ḥomer (Hebrew: קל וחומר).

Love your neighbor as yourself
When asked what the greatest commandment is, the Christian New Testament depicts Jesus answering: "You shall love the Lord your God with all your heart, and with all your soul, and with all your mind," before adding: "‘You shall love your neighbor as yourself.’ There is no other commandment greater than these." Most Christian denominations view these two commandments as, together, forming the core of the Christian religion. The second passage is considered to be a form of the Golden Rule.

See also

 Christian–Jewish reconciliation
 Christianity and Judaism
 Judeo-Christian
 Law of Christ
 New Commandment
 Ten Commandments

References

Notes

Citations

Biblical law
Biblical phrases
Book of Deuteronomy
Book of Leviticus
Christian ethics in the Bible
Christian terminology
Codes of conduct
Commandments
Doctrines and teachings of Jesus
Early Christianity and Judaism
Gospel of Mark
Gospel of Matthew
Gospel of Luke
Jewish theology
Love
New Testament theology
Positive Mitzvoth
Superlatives in religion